Hopea dryobalanoides is a tree in the family Dipterocarpaceae. The specific epithet dryobalanoides means "resembling Dryobalanops", referring to that genus of trees and particularly their leaf veins.

Description
The bark is cracked and flaky. The inflorescences bear up to six yellowish-cream flowers.

Distribution and habitat
Hopea dryobalanoides is native to Peninsular Malaysia, Sumatra and Borneo.

References

dryobalanoides
Flora of Peninsular Malaysia
Flora of Sumatra
Flora of Borneo
Plants described in 1861
Taxa named by Friedrich Anton Wilhelm Miquel